Thabang Amod Monare (born 16 September 1989) is a South African professional soccer player who played as a central midfielder for South African Premier Division club Orlando Pirates.

References

External links

Living people
1989 births
South African soccer players
South Africa international soccer players
People from Govan Mbeki Local Municipality
Association football midfielders
Jomo Cosmos F.C. players
Bidvest Wits F.C. players
Orlando Pirates F.C. players
South African Premier Division players
National First Division players